Sangue Puro is the third album by the band Les Georges Leningrad. It was released in 2006 on Tomlab. The title Sangue Puro is Italian for Pure Blood.

Track listing
"Sangue Puro" - 6:09
"Skulls in the Closet" - 2:59
"Scissorhands" - 3:21
"Ennio Morricone" - 3:20
"Eli, Eli, Lamma Sabacthani" - 3:47
"Mammal Beats" - 2:22
"Sleek Answer" - 4:10
"Mange Avec Tes Doigts" - 1:55
"Lonely Lonely" - 2:24
"The Future for Less" - 9:07

External links
Les Georges Leningrad official website
Tomlab artist page

References 

Les Georges Leningrad albums
2006 albums